Microgametogenesis is the process in plant reproduction where a microgametophyte develops in a pollen grain to the three-celled stage of its development. In flowering plants it occurs with a microspore mother cell inside the anther of the plant.

When the microgametophyte is first formed inside the pollen grain four sets of fertile cells called sporogenous cells are apparent. These cells are surrounded by a wall of sterile cells called the tapetum, which supplies food to the cell and eventually becomes the cell wall for the pollen grain. These sets of sporogenous cells eventually develop into diploid microspore mother cells. These microspore mother cells, also called microsporocytes, then undergo meiosis and become four microspore haploid cells. These new microspore cells then undergo mitosis and form a tube cell and a generative cell. The generative cell then undergoes mitosis one more time to form two male gametes, also called sperm.

See also
Gametogenesis

References

Raven, Peter H., Evert, Ray F., Eichhorn, Susan E.(2005). "Biology of Plants, 7th Edition". W. H. Freeman Chapter 19: 442–449.

Plant reproduction